EnChroma lenses are a brand of color correcting glasses designed to alleviate symptoms of red–green color blindness. Studies have shown that while the lenses alter the perception of already perceived colors, they do not restore normal color vision. Initial claims in excess of this by the manufacturer have been criticised and characterized as marketing hype. Recent research has shown the lenses have a positive impact on those with red-green color blindness.

History 
Glass scientist Donald McPherson invented EnChroma glasses by accident. He originally was trying to develop lenses to protect and aid surgeons during laser operations.

Technology 

The lenses focus on the most common color vision deficiency which is caused by the red and green retinal cone cells that, when responding to light, coincide. To eliminate the overlapping of the wavelengths of light, there is an optical material called a notch filter, which is capable of removing the exact wavelengths of light in the location where it overlaps, getting a simplified differentiation of colors. The glasses block specific wavelengths to create a clearer separation of different color signals so that they can be better calculated by the brain. The separation of signals allows most people with color blindness to distinguish colors, but the glasses will have little to no effect on the 20% of color blind people who have severe color impairment. A number of patents have been awarded based on the technology.

Scientific analysis 
A study in 2017 involving 23 males aged from 20 to 25 years with normal trichromatic color vision showed that Enchroma Cx-14 lens notches the blue and violet region of the visible spectrum. This induced participants with normal color vision to experience tritan defect when wearing the lens. In a subsequent study involving ten individuals with hereditary deficiencies (nine males and one female from age 19 to 52), the EnChroma Cx-14 filters did not significantly influence the vision of color blind subjects and "improved the error score in only two subjects".

In 2018, a study of EnChroma lenses showed that they help color blind people to see the same colors in a different way since the colored filter altered the way colors appeared in their eyes. The researchers found the effect of using EnChroma glasses is similar to glasses where the use of color filters changes the user's perception and increases the contrast among the colors, such as those used for shooting or hunting. The research showed that EnChroma glasses did not reveal any improvement in the Ishihara test and Farnsworth–Munsell 100 hue test.

In 2020, a UC Davis Health Eye Center study, conducted in collaboration with France’s INSERM Stem Cell and Brain Research Institute, found that EnChroma lenses enhanced color vision for those with the most common types of red-green color vision deficiency. The study also found that the color enhancing effect persisted even after taking off the glasses.

References

External links
 Official website

Lenses
Color vision
Optical filters